John Bence (27 September 1670–18 October 1718, Heveningham) was an English politician active in Suffolk, serving as a member of parliament for Dunwich and Ipswich.

References

1670 births
1718 deaths